Viviennea tegyra is a moth in the family Erebidae first described by Herbert Druce in 1896. It is found in Panama.

References

Phaegopterina
Moths described in 1896